Inishark or Inishshark, sometimes called Shark Island, is a small island neighbouring the larger Inishbofin in County Galway, Ireland.

Overview 

The island is now uninhabited; the last 23 inhabitants of this former isolated fishing and farming community were evacuated on the 20th of October 1960. The islanders had been unable to leave for months in winter and the government opted to resettle them on the mainland rather than build an expensive pier on the island.

Like Inishbofin, Inishark is composed almost entirely of Silurian slates and shales.

The documentary film Inis Airc, Bás Oileáin (Inishark, Death of an Island) produced in 2007 by C-Board Films for TG4, told the story of the last years and abandonment of Inishark. Produced and directed by Kieran Concannon, it featured interviews with surviving islanders and archive newsreel footage of the final evacuation.

In 2009, Boston College's Irish Studies program (in cooperation with Irish Film Institute) screened Inis Airc, Bás Oileáin (Inishark, Death of an Island) as part of the Irish Studies Film Series telling the evacuation story from the surviving islanders' viewpoint.

History 
The island was occupied for thousands of years and has many Bronze Age sites such as burial grounds and monuments.

The name Inishark, Irish Inis Airc, may derive from an ancient chief or king named Erc; other writers connect the name with searc, "love" (Old Irish serc), or with Old Irish airc meaning "hardship" or "strait."

The island's patron saint was Leo of Inis Airc, who lived there sometime between the sixth and eighth centuries. The remains of a 19th-century church named after him lie on the island today.

On Easter Sunday, 1949 three young islanders drowned travelling to Inishbofin for mass. Soon afterwards, during a period when the island was cut off due to bad weather, another young man died from appendicitis. These incidents as well as emigration were contributing factors driving the clamour to evacuate the island, as by this point there were few young people remaining on it.

Demographics 
The table below reports data on Inishhark's population taken from Discover the Islands of Ireland (Alex Ritsema, Collins Press, 1999) and the Census of Ireland. Census data in Ireland before 1841 are not considered complete and/or reliable.

See also 

 Clare Island
 Caher Island, County Mayo
 Inishturk

References

External links 
 
 Inishark, Death of an Island. Contemporary Daily Mirror story about the day the island was evacuated. 1960-10-27.
 The surviving residents of Inishark : Narrated documentary slideshow about Inishark and its surviving residents produced for the fiftieth anniversary of the evacuation of the island. Cyril Byrne. The Irish Times, 2010-10-20.
 Inis Airc: Bás Oileán – Youtube Video
vox hiberionacum - Early Irish Christianity and Early Medieval Ireland

Islands of County Galway
Uninhabited islands of Ireland